The Steel Tire was awarded, from 1940 until 1995, to the winner of the annual college football game between the University of Akron and Youngstown State University. The trophy comes from the main products of the two cities; Akron for its rubber and Youngstown for its steel.

The series was discontinued after 1995.  Youngstown State leads the overall series 19–14–2, including victories in each of the last three games. The two schools were scheduled to meet on September 5, 2020, but was canceled due to continuing concerns over the COVID-19 pandemic.

Game results

See also  
 List of NCAA college football rivalry games

References

College football rivalry trophies in the United States
Akron Zips football
Youngstown State Penguins football